Matagari Diazasouba is a retired Côte d'Ivoire sprinter.

Her biggest outing was the 2003 World Championships, where she competed in the 4 x 100 metres relay without reaching the final.

She won a silver medal in the same event at the 2002 African Championships, and also finished thirteenth in the long jump there.

References

Year of birth missing (living people)
Living people
Ivorian female sprinters
World Athletics Championships athletes for Ivory Coast